There was a double by-election in Glasgow Anniesland in 2000.

Donald Dewar, a leading figure in Scottish Labour politics, had in 1999 been elected to the Scottish Parliament where he had become First Minister of the Scottish Parliament, but he retained his seat in the Parliament of the United Kingdom intending to stand down at the next general election. However, Dewar died on 11 October 2000 from a massive brain haemorrhage, possibly brought on by a fall he suffered outside his official residence the previous day. This created a by-election for his seat of Glasgow Anniesland in the UK Parliament and Glasgow Anniesland in the Scottish Parliament.

Both elections were held on the same day, and polling day was set for 23 November. John Robertson had already been chosen to fight the seat for Labour at the general election and therefore stood at the byelection. The Labour vote declined, but with the main beneficiary being the small Scottish Socialist Party rather than the challenging Scottish National Party, the seat was comfortably held.

Results

Westminster result
The turnout was 38.1%.

General election result, 1997

Scottish Parliament result

See also
 Glasgow Anniesland (UK Parliament constituency)
 Glasgow Anniesland (Scottish Parliament constituency)
 Elections in Scotland
 List of by-elections to the Scottish Parliament
 Lists of United Kingdom by-elections

References

External links
Scottish Election Results 1997 – present

2000 elections in the United Kingdom
2000 in Scotland
2000s elections in Scotland
By-elections to the Parliament of the United Kingdom in Glasgow constituencies
Glasgow Anniesland 2000
Elections in Glasgow
2000s in Glasgow
November 2000 events in the United Kingdom